Pagellus is a genus of porgies in the family Sparidae.

References

External links

 
Sparidae
Extant Eocene first appearances
Marine fish genera
Taxa named by Achille Valenciennes